Mick Crotty is a former Irish sportsperson.  He played hurling with his local club James Stephens and with the Kilkenny senior inter-county team in the 1970s.

Playing career

Club

Crotty first tasted hurling success at club level when he was studying at University College Cork.  He won a senior county title in Cork in 1969 with UCC.  Later that year he won a senior county title with James Stephens in Kilkenny.  In 1975 he won a second Kilkenny county medal.  This was later quickly converted into a Leinster club title and an All-Ireland club title.  1976 saw Crotty add another county medal to his collection, however, ‘the Village’ club lost their provincial and All-Ireland titles.  Five years later in 1981 he won a final county medal.  Once again this victory was converted into another set of Leinster and All-Ireland club titles.

Inter-county
Crotty first came to prominence on the inter-county scene with Kilkenny in the late 1960s.  He won an Oireachtas title with the county in 1969, however, it would be another few years before he became a regular member of the team.  In 1972 Crotty won his first Leinster title.  This was later converted into a first All-Ireland title as Kilkenny defeated Cork in a classic final.  A second Leinster medal followed in 1973, however, ‘the Cats’ were later defeated by Limerick in the subsequent All-Ireland final.  Kilkenny were back in 1974 with Crotty adding a third consecutive Leinster medal to his collection.  He later won his second All-Ireland medal as Kilkenny gained revenge on Limerick by defeating them in the championship decider. Crotty won an All Star award for his performances in the 1974 championship. In 1975 Crotty claimed a fourth Leinster medal, before winning his third All-Ireland medal following a victory over surprise finalists Galway.  Kilkenny lost their provincial crown in 1976, however, Crotty did add a National Hurling League medal to his collection earlier in the year.  ‘The Cats’ bounced back in 1978 with Crotty winning a fifth provincial title.  Unfortunately, his team were later defeated by Cork in the All-Ireland final, as ‘the Rebels’ completed the final leg of a three-in-a-row of championship titles.  1979 saw Kilkenny continue their dominance in Leinster with Crotty winning his sixth and final provincial title.  He later collected his fourth and final All-Ireland medal as Kilkenny defeated Galway once again.  Crotty also won a Railway Cup medal with Leinster in 1979.

References

1945 births
Living people
James Stephens hurlers
UCC hurlers
Kilkenny inter-county hurlers
All-Ireland Senior Hurling Championship winners
Hurling selectors